Rosslyn Hill is a road in London, connecting the south end of Hampstead High Street to the north end of Haverstock Hill. It is the site of the Rosslyn Hill Unitarian Chapel, St. Stephen's Church and the Royal Free Hospital. It is served by the bus routes N5, C11, 46 and 268. Pond Street links it to Hampstead Heath railway station.

Haverstock Hill, Rosslyn Hill, and Heath Street, Hampstead together constitute one long hill 2.8 km long, rising 99 m, with an average grade of 3.5% (maximum 8.5%).

External links
Rosslyn Hill in 1848

References

Hills of London
Geography of the London Borough of Camden
Hampstead